Kond Sofla (also Romanized as Kond Soflá; also known as Kond-e Pā’īn and Kand-e Pā’īn) is a village in Lavasan-e Kuchak Rural District, Lavasanat District, Shemiranat County, Tehran Province, Iran. At the 2006 census, its population was 122, in 30 families.

References 

Populated places in Shemiranat County